Almàssera is a municipality in the comarca of Horta Nord in the Valencian Community, Spain. The name is Arabic for "mill", meaning the olive mills that were established there. In Spanish it's called 'Almácera'.

References

Municipalities in the Province of Valencia
Horta Nord